Rivarossa is a comune (municipality) in the Metropolitan City of Turin in the Italian region Piedmont, located about 20 km north of Turin.  
Rivarossa borders the following municipalities: Rivarolo Canavese, Oglianico, Front, San Francesco al Campo, and Lombardore.

References

Cities and towns in Piedmont
Canavese